Kristi Pinderi (born August 2, 1982, Pogradec) is an Albanian activist advocating for LGBT community rights and a freelance journalist resident in Canada. He is the founder of the Pro-LGBT organization in Albania.

Political activism 
Kristi Pinderi, known in Albania as an LGBT rights activist, has fled Albania, and lives in Canada. He came out to his family at the age of 27.

In March 2012, he established Pro-LGBT, an organisation that works mainly to raise awareness about LGBT topics. In May of that year, along with 8 other activists he pedaled at the Dëshmorët e Kombit Boulevard in Tirana in what was called the first pride event in Albania.

During the parliamentary elections of 2013, Pinderi, together with activist Xheni Karaj, developed for the first time a series of consultations with key political parties to include LGBT rights reference in their programs. In the framework of that initiative, Pinderi and Karaj had the opportunity to meet with former Prime Minister Sali Berisha and with his challenger Socialist Party leader Edi Rama. As a result of these lobbying efforts, Albania adopted in 2016 a National Action Plan for LGBTI people, a plan that was welcomed by the former Albanian Ombudsman Igli Totozani. In December 2014, Pinderi was a co-founder of the STREHA, a residential shelter assisting homeless LGBT youth, the first such center throughout South East Europe, supported by USAID, the British Embassy in Tirana and the British organization Albert Kennedy Trust.

In May 2015, along with Karaj, he produced a long-featured documentary entitled SkaNdal, directed by Elton Baxhaku and Eriona Camit. The documentary was about the history of the LGBT movement and it featured at several international film festivals, such as at the Sarajevo Film Festival, at DokuFest in Prizren, etc.

In his years of activism, Pinderi is known for several heated debates in the media with politicians, and with figures from the art and culture environment, with journalists, as well as for some long lasting controversial media debates with former Albanian MP Mesila Doda (an opponent of same-sex marriages, compared by Pinderi as an Albanian Anita Bryant) or with the singer Eneda Tarifa, whom he publicly called a homophobic person after she made some controversial comments when singer Conchita Wurst  won the Eurovision Song Contest in 2014, with actor Julian Deda, with journalist Enkel Demi, etc.

In June 2019, while studying at Langara College, he started working as the lead facilitator for a support group for LGBTQ+ newcomers in Surrey, British Columbia, a project hosted by DIVERSEcity, a community resources and resettlement non-profit in Canada.

In Canada he is often invited to speak as an advocate for refugees. In a recent event organized by University of British Columbia, where he studies in the School of Social Work and other organizations he spoke about borders and how they can be reimagined in a more human-centered way.

In 2021 Pinderi was a finalist of the 13th annual Top 25 Canadian Immigrant Awards, a national awards program presented by Canadian Immigrant magazine, and awarded annually to 25 inspirational immigrants, who have made a difference to Canada, whether they are a community advocate, a successful entrepreneur, an artist or a volunteer.

1997 
In January 2020 he published his memoir entitled "1997", a publication supported by the European Union. During the promotion of the book, feminist activists Xheni Karaj and Gresa Hasa read short paragraphs, and lead a discussion focusing especially on the disclosure of intimate events experienced by Pinderi, such as sexual assaults and repeated violence during his adolescence in Pogradec. The book is considered the first memoir written by an openly gay man in Albania, and the first publication by an Albanian author that deals with issues such as sexual violence, and child abuse.

Personal life 
At the end of May 2017, Pinderi left Albania due to the many threats, a year after the death of his mother, Liljana Priftuli, following a long illness. She was among the first mothers who publicly supported the rights of LGBT community in Albania. In an article on Dailyxtra, a Canadian media outlet, Pinderi talked about the difficult situation that the LGBT community is facing in Albania and the reasons that forced him to go to Canada, together with his partner, Erjon Tela, also one of the first LGBT rights activists in Albania.

References

External links 

Kristi Pinderi on Twitter
Pro-LGBT organization in Albania
 Activism the most important and powerful moment in my life

Albanian LGBT people
People from Pogradec
1982 births
Living people
Albanian LGBT rights activists
Albanian emigrants to Canada
Langara College people